West Yingao Road is a station on Shanghai Metro Line 3, which is located in Gaojing Town, Baoshan District.

References

Shanghai Metro stations in Baoshan District
Line 3, Shanghai Metro
Railway stations in China opened in 2006
Railway stations in Shanghai